Cathedral Peak may be any of several mountains, typically those with steep sides and towers reminiscent of a cathedral. In the United States alone, the USGS identifies 17 summits named "Cathedral Peak".

In other countries:
Cathedral Peak (South Africa), summit in the Drakensberg
Cathedral Peak, Karakoram, peak in Karakoram

See also
 Cathedral Mountain
 Cathedral Rock
 Cathedral Spires